Chowk Pindori is a village situated near Kallar Sayedan about 30 km away from Rawalpindi, Pakistan. Two sub-villages, Shahbagh and Darkali, are nearby.

Pothwari, which resembles Punjabi, is the predominant spoken language.

Economy 
The community's main source of income is agriculture. Locals mainly cultivate wheat and maize, along with dairy products.

Culture 
Punjabi culture is practiced by the community. Inhabitants usually wear shalwar kameez, dupatta, and perform bhangra in wedding functions.

Populated places in Kallar Syedan Tehsil